The Ryer Island Ferry is a ferry that operates between Rio Vista and Ryer Island, crossing Cache Slough in the Sacramento–San Joaquin River Delta in Solano County, California. The California Department of Transportation (Caltrans) operates the vehicle roll-on/roll-off service, which is classified as part of California State Route 84. The ferry operates every 20 minutes; on the hour, 20 minutes after the hour, and 40 minutes after the hour.

The ferry is served by the vessel Real McCoy II which is 88-feet long by 38-feet wide and entered service in 2011, replacing the venerable Real McCoy. It is powered by a hydraulic propulsion system, with 360 degree propellers for steering. The hull's capacity is 80,000 pounds, and can carry up to eight vehicles. There is a 16.25-ton weight limit, tractor-trailers are prohibited, and the length limit is at the discretion of the Coast Guard.

Ryer Island is also connected via the other Caltrans delta ferry, the Howard Landing Ferry, on Highway 220 to the east towards Ryde, and north via Highway 84 on a bridge towards West Sacramento.

References

Ferries on the California highway system